Antonio Molina (9 March 1928 - 18 March 1992) was a Spanish Flamenco dancer and popular singer and actor in films and on theatrical stage. Born in Málaga, from the age of 10 he showed great aptitude for flamenco singing, and became popular by participating in various radio shows. He had a high, brilliant voice, which he perhaps abused until he lost it prematurely. He was very popular starring in many theater shows.  His film career began in 1953, and he is remembered for films such as "El pescador de coplas" (1953), "Esa voz es una mina" (1955), and "La hija de Juan Simón" (1956). He maintained his popularity for many years by touring with his own musical show. After a few years of retirement, he attempted an unsuccessful come-back in 1986.

Molina was the husband of Angela Tejedor and they had 8 children, among them actors and actresses (Ángela Molina, Miguel Molina, Paula Molina, Noel Molina and Mónica Molina). He died in Madrid in 1992.

Filmography
Puente de coplas (1961)
Café de Chinitas (1958)
The Christ of the Lanterns (1958 film) (1958)
 Juan Simón's Daughter (1957)
Malagueña (1956)
Esa voz es una mina (1955)
 The Fisher of Songs (1954)
El macetero (1951)
For Whom the Bell Tolls (1943)

External links
 :es:Antonio Molina wiki in Spanish
 https://web.archive.org/web/20090628095123/http://spanish.imdb.com/name/nm0596639/
 Álbumes del cantante
 Perfiles flamencos

1928 births
1992 deaths
People from Málaga
Singers from Andalusia
Flamenco singers
Spanish male stage actors
Spanish male film actors
20th-century Spanish male actors
20th-century Spanish singers
20th-century Spanish male singers